Turkish Left (in Turkish: Türk Solu) was a weekly nationalist and socialist magazine and the official organ of the Turkish Left (in Turkish: Türk Solu) group in Turkey. It is the continuation of Yön, an influential political magazine in Turkey in the 1960s. Türk Solu was formed following a split in the Workers' Party (İP). The magazine was led by Gökçe Fırat Çulhaoğlu and was based in Istanbul.

They consider themselves as nationalist, socialist and Kemalist. They often promote Nationalism, Socialism and Secularism. However, unlike many socialists, they criticise Marx often and they consider Mustafa Kemal Atatürk and Sultan Galiev as ideologues of Turkic Socialism. They are influenced by Attila İlhan, Doğan Avcıoğlu and Şevket Süreyya Aydemir also. They have been in favour of Yasser Arafat, Saddam Hussein, Kim Jong Il, Muammar Gaddafi and Hugo Chavez because of their Socialism and Third Worldism, Rauf Denktaş and Rebiya Kadeer because of their Pan-Turkism.

They supported good relations with Turkic and Islamic countries and they view the USA, Israel, EU, Russia and China as enemies of Turkey.

They were often criticised for their views on Kurds. Especially their "Kurdish Invasion in Turkish Cities" theory is famous. They defended themselves with saying that Turkey is a nation-state and even saying "I'm Kurd" is separatism. They defend it with Nation definition of Turkish constitution. According to it, "every citizen of Turkey is Turkish, regardless of ethnic group, race and religion." Türk Solu defended that Kurds should melt in Turkish pot.

Unlike most of Kemalists, they also admired Ottomans and defended its legacy except 19th-century Ottomans. They considered Osman I and Atatürk as similar leaders, who both created new states instead serving a defeated, perished state. Despite they also appropriate Mehmed II, Selim I and Suleiman the Magnificent, they considered Mahmud II, Abdulhamid II and Mehmed VI as traitors, they have a similar view of other last era Ottoman sultans.

The group published Türk Solu and İleri and founded a political party called Ulusal Parti.

The magazine was closed following the 15 July 2016 coup in Turkey and the magazine founder Gökçe Fırat Çulhaoğlu was arrested.

References

External links
 Türk Solu

2002 establishments in Turkey
2016 disestablishments in Turkey
Defunct political magazines published in Turkey
Left-wing nationalism
Magazines established in 2002
Magazines disestablished in 2016
Magazines published in Istanbul
Socialist magazines
Turkish-language magazines
Turkish nationalism
Weekly magazines published in Turkey
Banned magazines